Turbo angelvaldesi is a species of sea snail, a marine gastropod mollusk in the family Turbinidae, the turban snails.

Distribution
This species occurs in the Gulf of Mexico off Yucatan.

Description 
The maximum recorded shell length is 45.6 mm.

Habitat 
The minimum recorded depth is 43 m, and the maximum recorded depth is 43 m.

References

 Rosenberg, G., F. Moretzsohn, and E. F. García. 2009. Gastropoda (Mollusca) of the Gulf of Mexico, Pp. 579–699 in Felder, D.L. and D.K. Camp (eds.), Gulf of Mexico–Origins, Waters, and Biota. Biodiversity. Texas A&M Press, College Station, Texas.
 Alf A. & Kreipl K. (2011) The family Turbinidae. Subfamily Turbinidae, Genus Turbo. Errata, corrections and new information on the genera Lunella, Modelia and Turbo (vol. I). In: G.T. Poppe & K. Groh (eds), A Conchological Iconography. Hackenheim: Conchbooks. pp. 69–72, pls 96–103.

angelvaldesi
Gastropods described in 1996